is a Japanese actress, singer and tarento.

Biography 
Hiroko Hayashi made her TV-drama debut in Tabiji in 1965. She debuted as a singer in 1974.

In 1979, she married Hisao Kurosawa, a film producer whose father was Akira Kurosawa, but later they divorced. They have three children. She also has three grandchildren by her eldest daughter Yu Kurosawa (1982).

Filmography 

Television 
 Tabiji (1965)
 Akogare (1966)
 Kamen Rider (1971)
 Henshin Ninja Arashi (1972), Kasumi
 Kunitori Monogatari (1973), Akechi Tama
 Ultraman Mebius (2006), Keiko Kuze

Film
 Tora-san's Dream of Spring (1979), Megumi Takai

Discography

Singles

{| class="wikitable"
!#||Title||Release Date/Chart Position
|-
||1||align="left"|Debut single||align="right"|1974-03-25 (#33)
|-
|2||align="left"|||align="right"|1974-06-25 (#71)
|-
|3||align="left"|||align="right"|1974-09-25 (#70)
|-
|4||align="left"|||align="right"|1975-01-10 (#-)
|-
|5||align="left"|||align="right"|1975-05-10 (#-)
|-
|6||align="left"|||align="right"|1975-09-10 (#31)
|-
|7||align="left"|||align="right"|1976-01-10 (#51)
|-
|8||align="left"|''||align="right"|1976-03-25 (#61)
|-
|9||align="left"|||align="right"|1976-08-10 (#88)
|-
|10||align="left"|||align="right"|1977-01-25 (#67)
|-
|11||align="left"|||align="right"|1977-04-25 (#-)
|-
|12||align="left"|||align="right"|1977-08-25 (#-)
|-
|13||align="left"|||align="right"|1978-08-21 (#-)
|-
|14||align="left"|||align="right"|2003-11-21 (#-)
|}

 References 

 Nihon Tarento Meikan (2006)'', VIP Times, 

Japanese actresses
Japanese women singers
Japanese idols
Japanese television personalities
1959 births
Living people
Singers from Tokyo